This is a list of quantum field theories. The first few sections are organized according to their matter content, that is, the types of fields appearing in the theory. This is just one of many ways to organize quantum field theories, but reflects the way the subject is taught pedagogically.

Scalar field theory 

Theories whose matter content consists of only scalar fields
Klein-Gordon: free scalar field theory
φ4 theory
Sine-Gordon
Toda field theory

Spinor field theory 

Theories whose matter content consists only of spinor fields
Dirac theory: free spinor field theory
Thirring model
Nambu–Jona-Lasinio model
Gross–Neveu model

Gauge field theory 

Theories whose matter content consists only of gauge fields
Yang–Mills theory
 Proca theory
Chern–Simons theory

Interacting theories 

Spinor and scalar
Yukawa model

Scalar and gauge
Scalar electrodynamics
Scalar chromodynamics
 Yang–Mills–Higgs

Spinor and gauge
Quantum electrodynamics (QED)
Schwinger model (1+1D case of QED)
Quantum chromodynamics (QCD)

Scalar, spinor and gauge
Standard Model

Sigma models 

Non-linear sigma model
Wess–Zumino–Witten model

Supersymmetric quantum field theories 
 Wess–Zumino model
 Supersymmetric Yang–Mills
 Seiberg–Witten theory
 Super QCD (sQCD)

Superconformal quantum field theories 

 N = 4 supersymmetric Yang–Mills theory
 ABJM superconformal field theory
 6D (2,0) superconformal field theory

String theories 
Theories studied in the branch of quantum field theory known as string theory. These theories are without supersymmetry.
 Polyakov action
 Nambu-Goto action
 Bosonic string theory

Other quantum field theories 

Chiral model
Kondo model (s-d model)
Minimal model (Virasoro minimal model)

Branches of quantum field theory 
String theory
Conformal field theory
Supersymmetry
Topological quantum field theory
Noncommutative quantum field theory
Local quantum field theory (also known as Algebraic quantum field theory or AQFT)

Quantum field theory
Supersymmetric quantum field theory
String theory